The Battle of Tepic was an engagement during the Mexican Revolution where two formers allies Emil Lewis Holmdahl and Martín Espinosa, turned enemies fought for control over the provincial capital of Tepic.

Battle

Holmdahl and 7 officers were brought before Espinosa, who asked them to join his Junta. They refused and then wisely fled to the mountains, from where they joined 280 Cora Indians loyal to Madero. Holmdahl, the 7 officers, and the Indians attacked Tepic, armed with bows and arrows and an old brass cannon.

Espinosa and his forces numbering between 2,000 to 5,000 men while his men were armed with guns. Holmdahl had presumed that Espinosa's men would defect and join their cause. They didn't and the battle erupting into a brutal fight on the city streets. Holmdahl and his men outnumbered began to loose ground, while Holmdahl was wounded by a shell that burst near him killing the man next to him. After 36 hours of fighting, Holmdahl's forces were defeated with 2/3 of their men dead including all 7 officers.

Aftermath

Holmdahl would disband his faction and join Madero's cause and would distinguish himself during the revolution. Espinosa on the otherside would later loose tepic, be exiled by Victoriano Huerta, and later assassinated.

Sources

Soldier of Fortune: Adventuring in Latin America and Mexico with Emil Lewis Holmdahl By Douglas V. Meed
Nayarit and The Mexican Revolution, 1910-1920 By. Wayne A. Sabesk
Mountjoy, Joseph B. (2013). "Aztatlan Complex". In Evans, Susan T.; Webster, David L. (eds.). Archaeology of Ancient Mexico and Central America: An Encyclopedia. Routledge
Taylor, Laurence D (1999) "The Magonista Revolt in Baja California". The Journal of San Diego History.

References 

Mexican Revolution
History of Mexico
1911 in Mexico
April 1911 events
Battles of the Mexican Revolution